Bay Area Bosses is a hip hop compilation album presented by JT the Bigga Figga. It was released on July 10, 2002 by Get Low Recordz.

Track listing
"Hustle Relentless"- 3:27  (JT the Bigga Figga)
"Get You Lit"- 4:35 (Keak Da Sneak) 
"Ghetto Slums"- 5:19 (C-Bo, JT the Bigga Figga, Phats Bossi, Fed-X, Ampachino) 
"Bossin' Up"- 4:12 (Mac Mall)  
"Livin Beyond Means"- 3:46 (Sean T, M.O.G. Stunt Team, Mississippi)  
"Handle It"- 3:48  (Joi Patrice)  
"457"- 4:08 (Tha Gamblaz)  
"Hold It Down"- 5:27  (Killa Tay, Cosmo)  
"Lil' Shop of Horrors"- 4:21 (Guce, Mobilotti)   
"Matter of Time"- 4:48  (Yukmouth, Tha Jet)  
"Retaliation Come Quick"- 4:06  (San Quinn, Tha Gamblaz)  
"What You Want?"- 4:57  (Messy Marv)
"Swiss Accounts"- 4:18  (Mob Figaz)   
"Mind on My Money"- 3:30 (JT The Bigga Figga, Tha Gamblaz, Joi Patrice)

External links
 

JT the Bigga Figga albums
West Coast hip hop compilation albums
2001 compilation albums
Gangsta rap compilation albums